Anthony John Steponovich (January 15, 1907 – January 5, 2000) was an American football player. He played college football at the University of Southern California and in the National Football League (NFL) as a guard and end for the Minneapolis Red Jackets (1930) and Frankford Yellow Jackets (1930). He appeared in 12 NFL games, 9 as a starter.

References

1907 births
2000 deaths
USC Trojans football players
Frankford Yellow Jackets players
Minneapolis Red Jackets players
Players of American football from Arizona